Doug Dersch (born April 18, 1946) was a Canadian football player who played for the Edmonton Eskimos, Montreal Alouettes, Hamilton Tiger-Cats and Toronto Argonauts. He won the Grey Cup with Hamilton in 1972. He played college football at the University of Calgary.

References

1946 births
Living people
Calgary Dinos football players
Canadian football linebackers
Edmonton Elks players
Hamilton Tiger-Cats players
People from Red Deer County
Players of Canadian football from Alberta